Laurence Charlotte Leboeuf (born December 13, 1985) is a Canadian actress.

Biography
Leboeuf was born on December 13, 1985 in Montreal, Quebec. She went to École Notre-Dame-de-Grâce for elementary and later on, she went to Villa Maria for high school.

She made her acting debut as Évelyne Boivin in the French Canadian television series Virginie. Later, she played Louise Lavigueur in the Quebec television series Les Lavigueur, la vraie histoire, and more recently as Apple in Turbo Kid.

She won the Prix Jutra for Best Supporting Actress at the 10th Jutra Awards, and received a Genie Award nomination for Best Supporting Actress at the 28th Genie Awards, for her performance in the 2007 film My Daughter, My Angel (Ma fille mon ange). She has also received Canadian Screen Award nominations for Best Supporting Actress in a Drama Series for 19-2 at the 3rd Canadian Screen Awards and the 4th Canadian Screen Awards, and Québec Cinéma nominations for Best Actress at the 17th Jutra Awards for The Little Queen (La petite reine) and at the 18th Quebec Cinema Awards for Turbo Kid.

At the 10th Canadian Screen Awards in 2022, she won the award for Best Actress in a Drama Series for her performance as Magalie Leblanc in Transplant.

Filmography

Film roles

Television roles

Awards

Notes

External links
 

1985 births
Actresses from Montreal
Canadian television actresses
Canadian film actresses
French Quebecers
Living people
20th-century Canadian actresses
21st-century Canadian actresses
Canadian child actresses
Best Actress in a Drama Series Canadian Screen Award winners
Best Supporting Actress Jutra and Iris Award winners